Uspenka is a rural locality (a khutor) and the administrative center of Uspenskoye Rural Settlement, Nekhayevsky District, Volgograd Oblast, Russia. The population was 415 as of 2010. There are 12 streets.

Geography 
Uspenka is located on the Kalach Upland, on the Manina River, 43 km northwest of Nekhayevskaya (the district's administrative centre) by road. Dryaglovsky is the nearest rural locality.

References 

Rural localities in Nekhayevsky District